Gjøvik Station is a railway station located in downtown Gjøvik in Oppland Norway. The station   is the terminus of the Gjøvik Line. It is located 123.83 km from Oslo Central Station and at 129.2 meters above sea level. Gjøvik is served by regional trains by Vy Gjøvikbanen, a subsidiary of Vy.

History

The station was opened 28 November 1902. The station building was designed by the railroad architect Paul Armin Due. It was built in a tiled brick. It was expanded in 1937 and 1952. The building was extended heritage protection by  Riksantikvaren in 2002. The station building currently houses the tourist information center for Gjøvik.

References

External links 

 Entry at Jernbaneverket 
 Entry at the Norwegian Railway Club 

Railway stations on the Gjøvik Line
Railway stations in Oppland
Railway stations opened in 1902
Gjøvik